Camels Creek is a  long 2nd order tributary to the Cape Fear River in Harnett County, North Carolina.  The lower reaches of this stream flow through Raven Rock State Park.

Course
Camels Creek rises about 0.25 miles north of Ryes, North Carolina and then flows northeasterly to join the Cape Fear River about 6 miles northeast of Boone Trail, North Carolina.

Watershed
Camels Creek drains  of area, receives about 46.7 in/year of precipitation, has a wetness index of 403.85 and is about 57% forested.

See also
List of rivers of North Carolina

External links
Raven Rock State Park

References

Rivers of North Carolina
Rivers of Harnett County, North Carolina
Tributaries of the Cape Fear River